Mount Hypipamee is a national park in Far North Queensland, Australia, 1,358 km northwest of Brisbane.

See also

 Protected areas of Queensland

References 

National parks of Far North Queensland
Protected areas established in 1939
1939 establishments in Australia